Gobindaganj is an Upazila of Gaibandha District and the Division of Rangpur. It is one of the largest upazila in Bangladesh including 17 unions and 1 municipality. Gobindaganj is also the home to the founders of Khaakism.

Geography 
It has 79464 households and total area 481.66 km2.

Demographics 
As of the 2011 Bangladesh census, Gobindaganj has a population of 514591. Males constitute 50.89% of the population, and females 49.11%.  This Upazila's adult population is 205,204. Gobindaganj has an average literacy rate of 97.1% (7+ years), and the national average of 48.4% literate.

Administration
Gobindaganj  Upazila is divided into Gobindaganj Municipality and 17 union parishads: Kamdia, Katabari, Shakhahar, Razahar, Sapmara, Darbosta, Taluk Kanupur, Nakai, Harirampur, Rakhalbururz, Fulbari, Gumanigonj, Kamardaha, Kocha Shahar, Shibpur, Mahimaganj, Shalmara.

The union parishads are subdivided into 339 mauzas and 375 villages.

Gobindaganj Municipality is subdivided into 9 wards and 22 mahallas.

In terms of total area and number of unions, it is the second largest upazila in Bangladesh. It is called the nucleus of Rangpur Division. It has 13 branches of different banks and 11 
colleges as well.

Economy

1. Small Cottage Industries (Kocha Shahar).

2. Rangpur Sugar Mills Limited (Mahimaganj). 

3. Agriculture (Rice & paddy, sugarcane, fisheries, and cattle rearing)

4. Business and others.

Education

According to Banglapedia, Gobindagonj Multilateral High School, founded in 1912, is a notable secondary school.

Literacy rate and educational institutions Average literacy 37.8%; male 42.9%, female 32.5%. Educational institutions: college 13, technical college 1, law college 1, teachers training college 1, secondary school 72, primary school 239, madrasa 153. Noted educational institutions: Gobindaganj Degree College (1965), Kamdia Nurul Haque Degree College (1972), Mahimaganj Degree College (1972), Gobindaganj Mahila College (1991), Nakaihat College, Mahimaganj Women College, Phulpukuria College, Shamim & Shakil Technical College, Akramul Haque Computer and ideal College, Shohorgachhi Adarsa Degree College, Gobindaganj Multilateral High School (1912), Kamdia Bilateral High School (1921), Gobindaganj BM Girls' High School (1940), Rangpur Sugar Mills High School (1962), Birat High School (1964), Shahargachhi Girls' High School (1971), Mahimaganj Alia Madrasa (1937), Mahimagonj high School(1945),Chandpara Alim Madrasa (1963), Chandpara Bi-Lateral High  School (1965), Kocha Shahar Bi-Lateral High  School (1962), Kocha Shahar Shilpanagori College o Goveshona Kendra  (2002).

References 

 
Upazilas of Gaibandha District